Paul Coussa (9 September 1917 – 7 July 2012) was a Syrian  born Iraqi prelate of the Armenian Catholic Church.

Born in Alep, Syria, he was ordained a priest in 1941, aged 23. He was appointed Auxiliary Bishop of the Antioch Syrian diocese on 26 August 1969, along with Titular Bishop of Colonia in Armenia. He was ordained bishop on 21 December 1969. He was appointed bishop of the Armenian Catholic Diocese of Baghdad on June 27, 1983 until his retirement on October 13, 2001, aged 94.

External links
Profile, Catholic-Hierarchy.org; accessed 25 June 2015.

1917 births
2012 deaths
20th-century Armenian Catholic bishops
Syrian bishops
People from Aleppo
Place of death missing